Beth A. Folsom (born October 12, 1957) is a New Hampshire politician.

Early life
Folsom was born in Bridgeport, Connecticut.

Career
On November 3, 2020, Folsom was elected to the New Hampshire House of Representatives seat that represents the Grafton 11 district. She was worn into office on December 2, 2020 as a Republican.

Personal life
Folsom resides in Wentworth, New Hampshire. Folsom is married to Jim, and together they have two children. Folsom is Baptist.

References

Living people
Baptists from New Hampshire
People from Grafton County, New Hampshire
Politicians from Bridgeport, Connecticut
Republican Party members of the New Hampshire House of Representatives
Women state legislators in New Hampshire
21st-century American politicians
21st-century American women politicians
1957 births